Stenodactylus sthenodactylus, also known as the Lichtenstein's short-fingered gecko or elegant gecko, is a species of lizard in the family Gekkonidae. The species is found in the Middle East and Northern Africa.

References

Stenodactylus
Reptiles described in 1823